Rá-Tim-Bum was a Brazilian children's TV program produced by TV Cultura and Industrial Social Services (Serviço Social da Indústria, or SESI in Portuguese). The program premiered on TV Cultura on February 5, 1990,  replacing Catavento, and stopped production in 1994.
As of 2015, the program is shown only on the TV channel, TV Rá-Tim-Bum.

Production 
Rá-Tim-Bum was created by Flávio de Souza and Fernando Meirelles in order to educate pre-school children, and extended to 192 episodes.

The program's name, and the sound track were authored by Edu Lobo, and inspired by the last line of the Brazilian happy birthday song Parabéns pra Você. The success of Rá-Tim-Bum led to the follow-on children's TV programs Castelo Rá-Tim-Bum and Ilha Rá-Tim-Bum, and a pay TV channel, TV Rá-Tim-Bum.

Awards 
Rá-Tim-Bum was awarded a gold medal at the International Film & TV Festival of New York in 1990.

In 1991 and 1993, Rá-Tim-Bum won the APCA award for Best Children's Program.

References

External links
 

1990s children's television series
1990s preschool education television series
1990 Brazilian television series debuts
Brazilian children's television series
Brazilian educational television series
Brazilian fantasy television series
Portuguese-language television shows
Television about magic
Brazilian television shows featuring puppetry
Television series with live action and animation
Television shows set in São Paulo